Karani may be:

 Caranqui language of Ecuador
 Karan language of Iran